The 25th GLAAD Media Awards was the 2014 annual presentation of the GLAAD Media Awards, presented by GLAAD honoring the 2013 season. The awards honored films, television shows, musicians and works of journalism that fairly and accurately represent the LGBT community and issues relevant to the community. The 25th Annual GLAAD Media Awards honored 93 nominees in 20 English-language categories and 37 nominees in nine Spanish-language categories.

The nominees were announced on January 30, 2014. The awards were presented in two separate ceremonies; at The Beverly Hilton in Los Angeles on April 12, 2014, and at the Waldorf Astoria in New York City on May 3, 2014.

Winners and nominees
The winners are indicated in bold.

English-language categories

Spanish-language categories

Honorary awards 

 Pioneer Award to Norman Lear
 Vanguard Award to Jennifer Lopez (The Fosters executive producer)
 Stephen F. Kolzak Award to Laverne Cox (Orange Is the New Black actress)
 International advocate for change award to Manny de Guerre
 Vito Russo Award to George Takei

References

External links

25th
GLAAD
2014 in California
2014 in LGBT history
2014 in New York City
2014 in Los Angeles
2014 in San Francisco
Lists of LGBT-related award winners and nominees